Mary Elizabeth Banotti (born 26 May 1939) is an Irish former Fine Gael politician who served as a Member of the European Parliament (MEP) for the Dublin constituency from 1984 to 2004.

Early life and education
Banotti was born in Malahide, Dublin, in 1939 to Jim and Kitty O'Mahony. She is a sister of the former Minister Nora Owen and her mother was a niece of the Irish political leader Michael Collins. Living on Seafield Road, Clontarf, she attended a private primary school run by the Misses Walsh, and then the local Holy Faith secondary convent school.

Career
Following her education she worked as a nurse in North America, Europe and Africa, before joining Irish Distillers as an occupational health nurse and Industrial Welfare Officer in 1972. She is divorced for many years from her Italian husband.

Between 1980 and 1984, she presented a weekly programme on social welfare rights and information on RTÉ television. Banotti unsuccessfully contested the 1983 Seanad election and the Dublin Central by-election the same year.

Politics
In 1984, she was elected to the European Parliament, representing the Dublin constituency. She retained her seat until her retirement at the 2004 European elections. She was Fine Gael's candidate in the 1997 presidential election, coming second to Fianna Fáil's Mary McAleese. In 1999, she also was the UNFPA's Goodwill Ambassador on reproductive health.

Philanthropy
Banotti is a member and Vice Chair of the Board of Directors of the International Centre for Missing & Exploited Children (ICMEC), a global nonprofit organization that combats child sexual exploitation, child pornography, and child abduction.

She is also currently the Honorary President of Health First Europe, and a member of the International Foundation for Electoral Systems' board.

References

External links

1939 births
Living people
Candidates for President of Ireland
Mary Banotti
20th-century women MEPs for the Republic of Ireland
Fine Gael MEPs
Irish nurses
MEPs for the Republic of Ireland 1999–2004
MEPs for the Republic of Ireland 1994–1999
MEPs for the Republic of Ireland 1989–1994
MEPs for the Republic of Ireland 1984–1989
Politicians from County Dublin
People from Malahide